In mathematics, the arithmetic genus of an algebraic variety is one of a few possible generalizations of the genus of an algebraic curve or Riemann surface.

Projective varieties 
Let X be a projective scheme of dimension r over a field k, the arithmetic genus  of X is defined asHere  is the Euler characteristic of the structure sheaf .

Complex projective manifolds
The arithmetic genus of a complex projective manifold 
of dimension n can be defined as a combination of Hodge numbers, namely

When n=1, the formula becomes . According to the Hodge theorem, . Consequently , where g is the usual (topological) meaning of genus of a surface, so the definitions are compatible.

When X is a compact Kähler manifold, applying  hp,q = hq,p recovers the earlier definition for projective varieties.

Kähler manifolds
By using hp,q = hq,p for compact Kähler manifolds this can be 
reformulated as the Euler characteristic in coherent cohomology for the structure sheaf :

 

This definition therefore can be applied to some other 
locally ringed spaces.

See also
Genus (mathematics)
 Geometric genus

References

Further reading
 

Topological methods of algebraic geometry